ILT may stand for:
 Instructor-led training
 Information Learning Technology
 Gallid alphaherpesvirus 1
 Inverse lithography technology 
 Invercargill Licensing Trust
 International League T20, Twenty20 cricket tournament in the United Arab Emirates

Instructional Leadership Team